Langedrag Nature Park (full name in Norwegian: E.K.T. AS, Langedrag Naturpark, Fjellgård og Leirskole) is a  farm, located 1.000 MAMSL, just south of Tunhovd in Nore og Uvdal municipality in Viken county, Norway.

The nature park is known for its collection of various old livestock breeds and wild animals from the Norwegian fauna.  Visitors experience exciting predator mammals like wolves and European lynxes, in addition to reindeer, moose, muskox, wild boars,  arctic foxes, horses, goats, chickens, ducks, geese and rabbits. Of more exotic animals, there are also wild yaks and European mouflons.

The Langedrag Nature Park is open all year and offers day visits, accommodation and short-term teaching plans that place special emphasis on outdoor activities.  There is also horse riding and horse-drawn carriage driving or sledding (horse or dog).  The farm at Langedrag Nature Park has been made well known in Norway through the TV series "Vi på Langedrag" ("We at Langedrag"), which NRK sent for the first time in 2001.

Gallery 

(All images from Langedrag Nature Park)

References

External links 
 Official website  | 
 Langedrag Nature Park  www.visitnorway.com

1960 establishments in Norway
Nore og Uvdal
Tourist attractions in Viken
Zoos in Norway